Podocarpus fasciculus is a species of conifer in the family Podocarpaceae. It is found in Japan and Taiwan. It is threatened by habitat loss.

References

fasciculus
Near threatened plants
Taxonomy articles created by Polbot
Taxa named by David John de Laubenfels